Red and Rover (often styled Red & Rover) is a daily syndicated comic strip by Brian Basset that debuted in 2000. Autobiographical in nature, Red & Rover is a retro-feel comic strip about the unconditional love between a dog and his boy that captures the spirit and flavor of the early-1960s to mid-1970s.

Red and Rover has been nominated four times for Best Newspaper Comic Strip. In 2013, Red and Rover received the Reuben Award for Best Newspaper Comic Strip by the National Cartoonists Society. On Sunday, May 7, 2000, Red and Rover appeared in newspapers for the first time.

Publication history 
Basset had been producing the comic strip Adam (now known as Adam@home) since 1984. In 1998, he began thinking about producing a second comic strip that had a more childlike quality to it.

In 2009, after nearly 25 years of drawing Adam@home, Basset decided to focus squarely on Red and Rover and he handed over the illustration duties of the older strip to Big Top artist Rob Harrell.

Originally syndicated for the first ten years by The Washington Post Writers Group, Red and Rover is currently syndicated to over 200 papers by Andrews McMeel Syndication.

Characters and story 
Red and Rover is usually set around the end of the 1960s or the beginning of the 1970s, although a strip from November 20, 2009, depicted a car which bears a striking resemblance to a mid-1970s Ford Country Squire station wagon, and in a Sunday strip from August 28, 2011 Red plays a parody of Jaws, a film from 1975.

Red (real name Russell McLean) is a ten-year-old boy with dreams of going into space one day. He enjoys model rocketry, baseball, reading comic books, and other pastimes associated with boys his age. He loves Rover, his dog. Red can understand what Rover is thinking. This trope is used famously, of course, in Charles M. Schulz 's Peanuts, where the bird Woodstock and sometimes, even Charlie Brown can similarly read Snoopy's thoughts. Red is often easygoing and even-tempered, being content with his life and having a simple outlook towards the world around him. He is rather lazy, as he can often be found sleeping or taking naps. Red mostly wears T-shirts with blue jeans and sneakers, but tends to go barefoot during the summer.

Rover is a dog with mostly Lab in him. Rover is usually cool, calm and collected, and is very loyal to Red. Red and Rover met when Rover rescued Red from being hit by a truck. Red took him home where he's stayed ever since. Rover, in turn, can understand what Red is thinking. In many strips Rover is shown chasing squirrels. On March 16, 2010, Rover revealed that his grandfather, "Merganser McIntire", was a Chesapeake Bay Retriever and his grandmother, "Codfish Kate", was part Portuguese Water Dog.

Martin McLean is Red's 17-year-old brother, taken as a member of the "in-crowd." Martin's bedroom is in his basement, and he likes the Rolling Stones. He has bangs that cover his eyes most of the time. He has a girlfriend – Red can be seen either listening in on phone conversations or spying on Martin when she comes over. Martin seems to think of Red as a lower form of life, and frequently torments him.

Caroline "Carrie" McLean is Red's mother. She is a part-time community college administrator. Carrie is known for her good fudge.

Conrad McLean is Red's father. He is an aerospace engineer. He enjoys bowling and barbecuing. He had a brother named Jimmy who was killed in action during the Vietnam War. Red and Rover place a flag on his uncle Jimmy's grave on Memorial Day.

External links
 
 Red & Rover Facebook Page

References

American comic strips
 2000 comics debuts
 Child characters in comics
 Comics about dogs
 Gag-a-day comics
 Comic strip duos
 Comics characters introduced in 2000
 American comics characters